Kedar Nath Rai is a leader of Sikkim Democratic Front. He is the Speaker of Sikkim Legislative Assembly. He was elected to the assembly from Poklok-Kamrang. Rai had earlier served as minister in the Government of Sikkim. He has also been elected from Jorethang during term of 2004–09.

References

Sikkim Democratic Front politicians
Speakers of the Sikkim Legislative Assembly
Living people
Year of birth missing (living people)
Sikkim politicians
Sikkim MLAs 1994–1999
Sikkim MLAs 1999–2004
Sikkim MLAs 2004–2009